The Fujitsu Micro 16s was a business personal computer from Fujitsu that was launched in 1983, around the same time as the launch of the original IBM PC/XT. The Micro 16s used a plug in microprocessor board, and two models were offered, an Intel 8086 and a Zilog Z80 expansion board. Additional expansion boards with the Motorola 68000, Intel 80286 and Zilog Z8000 processors were also planned. Additionally it had a Motorola 6809 co-processor.

As operating systems one could choose between Concurrent CP/M-86 with GSX graphic extension, MP/M-86, MS-DOS, CP/M (for the Z80 board) and Unix.

It could support up to four 320 KB 5.25-inch floppy disk drives, and a hard disk of up to 20 MB.

It had advanced color graphics with 640x200 resolution with 8 colors per pixel, based on a Motorola 6845 video chip, and used an RGB color video monitor.

Up to 1152 KB of memory could be supported.

The Fujitsu Micro 16s series was discontinued in 1986.

See also
 Kanji CP/M-86 (1984)

References

External links 
 Micro 16s at old-computers.com 

Early microcomputers
Fujitsu computers
Personal computers